Fredrik Lassas (born 1 October 1996) is a Finnish footballer, who most recently played for HIFK.

Career
He is a former youth talent of FC Futura of Porvoo. He has played for FC Honka and HJK as a youth player as well. His performances have earned him call-ups for youth national teams on regular basis. To date, he has represented Finnish youth national team on different levels 46 times in total (as of 5 April 2015) and commonly captains the team. He made his debut in the highest level of Finnish football, Veikkausliiga, on 26 October 2013, substituting Sakari Mattila.

On January 7, 2016 FC Köln confirmed on their website, that they had signed Lassas for their reserve team.

Accomplishments
- Promising Footballer of the Year (2014)

References

External links

Finnish footballers
Association football midfielders
Veikkausliiga players
HIFK Fotboll players
1996 births
Living people
Klubi 04 players
Expatriate footballers in Germany
1. FC Köln II players
Regionalliga players
People from Porvoo
Sportspeople from Uusimaa